Max Miller (born March 30, 1983) is an American YouTuber and cook known for being the creator and host of Tasting History, a culinary and history fusion web-show that recreates ancient or historical recipes and explains the history around them.

Early life 
Miller was born on March 30, 1983, in Phoenix, Arizona. He had an interest in history, and at six or seven, he started reading about Charles Cornwallis at the Siege of Yorktown that ended the American Revolutionary War in 1781, writing a report on it for fun.

He attended Arizona State University and earned a classical music degree, moving to New York City to train for Broadway theatre.

Career 
Miller moved from New York City to Los Angeles to pursue voice acting. He was hired at Walt Disney Studios in marketing before going into film distribution. During this time, he and a friend went to Walt Disney World while on vacation, but the friend was sick the entire time and they spent most of the time in the hotel. They started watching The Great British Bake Off and became inspired as he had not cooked before. He then began cooking on his own, first baking a Battenberg cake.

After being inspired by The Great British Bake Off, Miller began to bring cakes and give mini lectures on them to his co-workers, and one of them suggested that he create videos on the topic. On December 23, 2019, he created the Tasting History channel.

In 2020, Miller was furloughed from Disney due to the COVID-19 pandemic, and started to spend time on the channel. He relegated himself to his upstairs as he did not want to get in his fiancé's way, who was still working at Disney. He started producing videos and uploaded the first episode of Tasting History in February 2020. He continued to create videos throughout the pandemic.

In January 2021, Tasting History reached 500K subscribers on YouTube. On February 22, 2021, publishing company Simon & Schuster announced that they would be publishing Miller's cookbook in 2022 via Tiller Press, with executive editor Anja Schmidt stating that the company was "thrilled to translate [Miller's] voice to the written page, complete with his recreated recipes and the history behind each one."

On April 14, 2021, he released a video titled "I Quit" explaining that Disney had contacted him to resume his job, but that he had quit his job at Disney and had become focused on the channel itself.

Personal life 
Miller is openly gay. In October 2021 he married his longtime fiancé Jose Mendoza. They have two cats named Jaime and Cersei.

References 

American YouTubers
1983 births
American chefs
Arizona State University alumni
LGBT YouTubers
Living people